Whittier House may refer to one of the following:

John Greenleaf Whittier House in Amesbury, Massachusetts
John Greenleaf Whittier Homestead in Haverhill, Massachusetts
Skolfield-Whittier House in Brunswick, Maine
Whittier House (Danville, Vermont)
Whittier House (Jersey City, New Jersey)

See also
 Whittier (disambiguation)